The bibliography of Pierre Schaeffer
is a list of the fictional and nonfictional writings of the electroacoustic musician-theoretician and pioneer of musique concrète, Pierre Schaeffer.

List

Fiction

Novels and short stories 

 Chlothar Nicole (1938)
 The Choirboys (1949) not choir but heart (same vocal word in French)
 The Old Man and His Movements (1964)
 The Guardian of The Volcano (1969)
 Excuse Me, I'm Dying and Other Fabulations (1981)
 Prelude, Choral and Fugue (1981)
 Faber and Sapiens (1986)

Plays 

 Tobie (1939)
 Secular Games (1946)

Non-fiction 

 America, We Ignore You (1946)
 In Search of a Concrete Music (1952)
 Towards an Experimental Music: Under the Direction of Pierre Schaeffer (1957) *
 Treatise on Musical Objects (1966)
 Concrete Music (1967)
 Music and Acoustics (1967)
 The Future Backwards (1970)
 Machines for Communicating 1. Genesis of Simulacra (1970)
 From Musical Experience to the Human Experience (1971)
 The Service of Research: Structures and Orientation (1974)

* An expanded version published by Richard-Masse later in 1957, based upon the article of the same name. (See "Towards an Experimental Music" below, under heading "Articles and essays".)

Articles and essays 

 Basic Truths ("Revue Musicale"; 1938)
 The Non-Visual Element of Films ("Revue du cinéma"; 1946)
 Introduction to Concrete Music ("Polyphonie"; 1950)
 To Give Ear, To Give Thought ("The Nave"; 1951)
 The Musical Object ("Revue Musicale"; 1952)
 The Experience of Concrete Music (1952)
 Towards an Experimental Music ("Revue Musicale"; 1957) *
 Musical Experiences. Music More Concrete, More Electronic, More Exotic ("Revue Musicale"; 1959)
 Experiences in Paris, June 1959 ("Revue Musicale"; 1959)
 New Reflections on the Communication[s] Triangle ("Les cahiers de la télévision"; 1969)
 Machines for Communicating ("Bulletin of the French Corporation of Philosophy"; 1970)
 Music and Computers ("Revue Musicale"; 1971)
 The Press of Television: A Mediator ("UER"; 1971)
 Society in the Mirror ("La jaune et la rouge"; 1971)
 Music for the Year 2000 ("Etudes"; 1971)
 The Communication[s] Triangle ("Notebooks of the Canadian Cultural Center"; 1971)
 Development of Public Service Television Networks: Prospects, Symptoms and Basic Assumptions (1972)
 Letter to the Researchers of Men ("Mail of the CNRS"; 1972)
 Machines for Communicating, Machines for Calculating ("IBM Computers", 1972)
 The Television in Public Services ("Communication and Languages"; 1972)
 Sound and Communication ("Cultures"; 1973)
 The Audiovisual: Method of Communication or Common Knowledge?("Swiss-French Economics"; 1973)
 In Search of Music Itself ("Revue Musicale Swiss"; 1975)
 Darwin and Marconi or the End of Television ("The Imaginaries", 1976)

* An article published 1957, later that year expanded into a book of the same name. (See "Towards an Experimental Music: Under the Direction of Pierre Schaeffer" above, under heading "Non-fiction".)

Collaborative works 

 Conversations with Pierre Schaeffer (Marc Pierret; 1969)
 Pierre Schaeffer followed by Reflections of Pierre Schaeffer (Sophie Brunet; 1969)
 Machines for Communicating 2. Power and Communication (Sophie Brunet; 1972)
 The Regulation of Microbic Sporulation (Jekisiel Szulmajster, J.P. Aubert; 1973)
 The Semiotics of Representation: Theatre, Television, and Comics (1975)
 Pierre Schaeffer: From Concrete Music to Music Itself (Sophie Brunet; 1977)
 The Antennas of Jericho (Claude Glayman; 1978)
 Guide to Acoustic Objects: Pierre Schaeffer and Musical Research (Michel Chion; 1983)
 The Gentle Revolution: Musique Concrète (Linda G. Witnov; 1985)
 A Visit to Brangues: Conversations Between Paul Claudel, Jacques Madaule and Pierre Schaeffer (Paul Claudel, Jaques Madaule; 2005)

Bibliographies by writer
 
Bibliographies of French writers